Ruth Bernadette Maguire is a Scottish National Party (SNP) politician who has been the Member of the Scottish Parliament (MSP) for Cunninghame South since the 2016 Scottish Parliament election.

Maguire was elected as a councillor for North Ayrshire Council in 2012, in the Irvine West ward. Alongside this role, Maguire was North Ayrshire Youth Champion, chaired the Violence against women partnership and served as Cabinet Member of Finance within the SNP admin.

On 5th of May 2016, Ruth was elected to represent Cunninghame South within the Scottish Parliament. She resigned as a councillor following her election to parliament. Maguire was re-elected in 2021 to continue representing Cunninghame South.  

Maguire is currently apart of committee’s for Education, Children and Young People and Local Government, Housing and Planning. She has also previously been on committees for; Local Government, Social Security, and Education and Skills.

Maguire is also a Co-convener for the cross-party group in the Scottish Parliament on Commercial Sexual Exploitation alongside being a member of the cross-party group on Nuclear Disarmament.

In April 2019, claiming it could change what it means to be male and female, Maguire was one of 15 SNP politicians who signed a public letter calling on the Scottish Government to delay reform to the Gender Recognition Act. Maguire was also the focus of a twitter storm and was called on to resign as convenor of Holyrood's Equalities and Human Rights committee after an exchange between her and SNP MSPs Ash Regan and Gillian Martin was leaked. In it, Maguire responded to a tweet praising the First Minister Nicola Sturgeon's 'positive feminist analysis of trans rights,' with ‘FFS’, agreed that Sturgeon was out of step with the SNP group, and questioned whether the minister in charge of the legislation, Shirley Anne Somerville, could have ignored what 'everyone' said.  

Shortly before the 2021 election, Maguire was diagnosed with stage 3 cervical cancer. After taking medical leave and successful treatment, she returned to Holyrood in December 2021.

References

External links
 personal website
 profile on SNP website
 

Year of birth missing (living people)
Living people
Place of birth missing (living people)
Scottish National Party MSPs
Members of the Scottish Parliament 2016–2021
Members of the Scottish Parliament 2021–2026
Female members of the Scottish Parliament
Scottish National Party councillors